Jaro (IPA: ['haɾo]), officially the Municipality of Jaro, is a 3rd class municipality in the province of Leyte, Philippines. According to the 2020 census, it has a population of 43,758 people.

History
In the early time of the Spanish regime, the section where the Jaro is situated today was a lush forest enjoying its primitive freedom undisturbed by human beings.

In those days, struggles between Christianity and Mohammedanism took place. Datu Buisan and Sirungan led one of the Moro expeditions. They came to the Visayas leading a fleet of colorful moro vintas razing Christian towns to the ground, killing the inhabitants and taking some as slaves. Christians had to unite against the invaders and this was how Jaro came into being.

There were two Leyteños known far and wide for their skill with the native arms and bravery in wars. These two men were Bonsilao of Ormoc and Sinirungan of Dagami. These two men were so strong that the people concluded that they possessed supernatural powers. This belief was strengthened by the fact that they managed to drive the Moros away. Later, the two men decided to settle in a centrally located place where they could easily give aid to the beleaguered Christians especially the inhabitants of Balugu, Kalgara and the neighboring towns. An ideal place was finally found. This was atop a hill and this same hill is where the parochial church of Jaro is situated. As time went by, the place was consequently cleared and homes were built. Small crooked paths were widened and thus a town was born.

The legendary background of this municipality has been for the most part connected with the surging Cabayongan River, which crisscrosses the town. This river had served the inhabitants in many ways, becoming as it were the flesh and blood of the community. As historical data points out, the municipality of Jaro was once called “Salug,” a proximate location to the Cabayongan River. Its fertile soil and abundant fruit-bearing trees contributed immensely to its early growth and expansion. It became a “visita” because of the periodic baptismal visit regularly made by the priest coming from the town of Barugo. This “visita” became the second name of the municipality of Jaro.

In later years, the village became the centrifuge of people coming from the outlying districts and regions due to a running well found at the foot of the hill where the present church now stands, the water of which was believed to be medicinal because of herbs whose roots were leading to the well. The old folks termed the mixture of the herbs from the hill as “Haro,” a medicinal potent drug supposed to cure all kinds of afflictions and diseases. People from near and far municipalities flocked to this place to be treated.

Thus, ultimately, the word “Haro” became a by-word among the people and later on used to denote the name of the place when it became a municipality in 1851. When the Spaniards came, “Haro” was transcribed as “Jaro”.

Notre Dame of Jaro, a Catholic school run by the sisters of the Oblates of Notre Dame, is located in Jaro.

Geography

Barangays
Jaro is politically subdivided into 46 barangays.

Climate

Demographics

Economy

Education
There are a total of 42 elementary schools and 5 high schools in Jaro, Leyte:

Elementary schools

Secondary/High School

References

External links
 [ Philippine Standard Geographic Code]
Philippine Census Information
Local Governance Performance Management System 

Municipalities of Leyte (province)